Hext is a surname. Notable people with the surname include:

 Alice Hext (1865–1939), Cornish philanthropist, gardener and magistrate
 Frances Margery Hext (1819-1896), historian
 John Hext (1842-1924), British naval officer
 Michael Hext (born 1961), British trombonist
 Suzanna Hext, British para swimmer and equestrian
 Tamara Hext (born 1963), American beauty queen from Texas